Gift of Screws is the fifth solo album by American musician and Fleetwood Mac vocalist/guitarist Lindsey Buckingham, and was released on September 15, 2008. Gift of Screws peaked at #48 on the Billboard 200 album chart in September 2008. Additionally, it also reached number #15 on the Billboard Rock Album Chart.

Album history
The album title existed as a solo album set for release in 2001 by Reprise Records.  Songs were recorded between 1995 and 2000, some of which were performed and recorded live by Fleetwood Mac for their The Dance album and tour in 1997. They also feature contributions from bandmates Mick Fleetwood and John McVie.

Upon presenting the finished album to Reprise, Buckingham was advised to retain some of the material for a forthcoming Fleetwood Mac album.  To this end, Buckingham contributed several of the songs towards the 2003 album Say You Will and ultimately his next solo project, Under the Skin, released in 2006.

However, high-quality bootlegs of the Gift of Screws project, which had been mixed but not yet mastered, were publicly circulated for free MP3 download in October 2001.

Buckingham mentioned in several interviews upon the release of Under the Skin that his next album was to be more rock-oriented and would possibly feature contributions from Fleetwood and McVie.

The album features a song ("Great Day") co-written with Buckingham's son Will and two songs co-written with his wife Kristen, who is also credited with the album's photography. On "Great Day", Buckingham built around Will's vocal melody with "fingerpicked acoustic parts, counterpoint vocals, and flashy leads." The title track takes its inspiration from an Emily Dickinson poem.

Track listing
All tracks written by Lindsey Buckingham except where noted.

Single releases
"Did You Miss Me" and "Love Runs Deeper" were serviced to radio stations as promo releases. "Did You Miss Me" was also released as a single via digital download. In addition, an EP was released from Gift of Screws that contained "Did You Miss Me", "Love Runs Deeper" and three live tracks from KBCO Studio C Sessions - "Did You Miss Me", "Time Precious Time" and "Big Love". Two videos that contained track commentaries for "Wait For You" and "Love Runs Deeper" were released as a digital download as well.

Format
The album was released physically on CD as well as a 180g heavyweight black vinyl disc in a Stoughton jacket with bonus CD in paper sleeve via Reprise Records.

Reception

Gift of Screws debuted on the Billboard 200 at #48 the week of October 4, 2008. The album was ranked #41 in Q's 50 Best Albums of 2008.

Personnel 
 Lindsey Buckingham – vocals, electric guitars, acoustic guitars, keyboards, bass, drums, percussion, programming
 John McVie – bass (4, 8)
 John Pierce – bass (7)
 Walfredo Reyes Jr. – drums (3, 5)
 Mick Fleetwood – drums (4, 7, 8), percussion (4, 7)

Production 
 Lindsey Buckingham – producer, engineer, mixing (1, 2, 3, 5-10)
 Rob Cavallo – producer (4, 8)
 Ken Allardyce – engineer 
 Mark Needham – engineer, mixing (4)
 Bernie Grundman – mastering at Bernie Grundman Mastering (Hollywood, California)
 Jeri Heiden – art direction, design 
 SMOG Design – art direction
 Nick Steinhardt – design 
 Kristen Buckingham – photography 
 Jeff Gros – additional photography 
 Irving Azoff – management 
 Tom Consolo – management
 Susan Markheim – management 
 Front Line Management – management company

References 

 Lindsey Buckingham official website, accessed July 12, 2008

Lindsey Buckingham albums
2008 albums
Albums produced by Lindsey Buckingham
Warner Records albums